Wiggins-Rolph House is a historic home located at Huntington in Suffolk County, New York. It was built in 1848 and is a -story, five-bay shingled residence in the Greek Revival style.  It has a modern 1-story south wing and modern 2-story north wing. It features a steeply pitched gable roof and paired interior end chimneys.

It was added to the National Register of Historic Places in 1985.

References

Houses on the National Register of Historic Places in New York (state)
Houses completed in 1848
Greek Revival houses in New York (state)
Houses in Suffolk County, New York
National Register of Historic Places in Suffolk County, New York